Summer Surf is the fifth studio album of surf music by Dick Dale and His Del-Tones. Dale wrote three of the tracks on the album, with Beach Boys' session musician Steve Douglas writing another three. The rest are culled from various writers that were not necessarily writing in the classic surf style. For example, the track titled "Glory Wave," written in the style of a spiritual, was originally written for the 1964 beach party film, Surf Party, where it was performed by Jackie DeShannon. This was the last album Dick Dale recorded with the Del-Tones due to his battle with rectal cancer, and the last album he would record until 1986.

Track listing
"Summer Surf" (Steve Douglas)
"Feel So Good" (Chuck Willis)
"Surfin'" (Jerry Leiber, Mike Stoller)
"Spanish Kiss" (Dick Dale)
"The Star (of David)" (Don P. Mason)
"Banzai Washout" (Steve Douglas)
"Glory Wave" (Jimmie Haskell, William Dunham)
"Surfin' Rebel" (Steve Douglas)
"Never On Sunday" (Billy Towne, Manos Hadjidakis)
"Mama's Gone Surfin'" (Carol Connors, Harvey Bruce, Steve Barri)
"Tidal Wave" (Dick Dale)
"Thunder Wave" (Dick Dale)
"Who Can He Be" (Doug Salmanca)
"Oh Marie" (Eduardo di Capua, Vincenzo Russo)

References

Bibliography
McParland, Stephen J. (1994). It's Party Time - A Musical Appreciation of the Beach Party Film Genre. USA: PTB Productions. pp. 39. 

1964 albums
Dick Dale albums
Capitol Records albums